Manchester Piccadilly is the principal railway station in Manchester, England. Opened as Store Street in 1842, it was renamed Manchester London Road in 1847 and became Manchester Piccadilly in 1960. Located to the south-east of Manchester city centre, it hosts long-distance intercity and cross-country services to national destinations including London, Birmingham, Nottingham, Glasgow, Edinburgh, Cardiff, Bristol, Exeter, Plymouth, Reading, Southampton and Bournemouth; regional services to destinations in Northern England including Liverpool, Leeds, Sheffield, Newcastle and York; and local commuter services around Greater Manchester. It is one of 19 major stations managed by Network Rail. The station has 14 platforms: 12 terminal and two through platforms (numbers 13 and 14). Piccadilly is also a major interchange with the Metrolink light rail system with two tram platforms in its undercroft.

Piccadilly is the busiest station in the Manchester station group with over 30million passenger entries and exits between April 2019 and March 2020 (the other major stations in Manchester are Oxford Road and Victoria). As of March 2020, it is the third-busiest station in the United Kingdom outside of London (after Birmingham New Street and Glasgow Central), and is also the fourth-busiest interchange station outside London, with over 2million passengers changing trains annually. The station hosts services from six train operating companies.

Between the late 1990s and early 2000s, Piccadilly station was refurbished, taking five years and costing £100million (in 2002); it was the most expensive improvement on the UK rail network at the time. Further improvements and expansion plans have been proposed. In December 2014, a Transport and Works Act application was submitted for the construction of two through platforms as part of the Manchester Piccadilly and Manchester Oxford Road Capacity Scheme. As of 2023, this application has not been approved by the incumbent government although Network Rail declared the Castlefield corridor through Manchester 'congested' in September 2019.

A new Manchester Piccadilly High Speed station is planned to be built on a viaduct parallel to the north side of the existing station. The station will have six platforms (three islands) for both terminating High Speed 2 trains from London and Birmingham as well as Northern Powerhouse Rail trains to Liverpool, Warrington, Huddersfield, Leeds and beyond. The present Piccadilly Metrolink stop is proposed to be relocated from ground-level below the existing station platforms to a new larger four-platform stop located underground below the high speed station. Provision for a second ground-level Metrolink stop at the eastern end of the high speed station to service future Metrolink extensions, to be called Piccadilly Central, also form part of the plans. A hybrid bill was laid in Parliament on 24 January 2022 seeking powers to permit construction of the scheme.

History

Origins

In June 1840, the Manchester and Birmingham Railway (M&BR) opened a temporary terminus on its line to Stockport on Travis Street. The station was opened adjacent to London Road on 8 May 1842. It had two platforms, offices and passenger amenities and by then the line had been extended to Crewe. 

Store Street was designed by M&BR's chief engineer, George W. Buck, who designed many of the line's structures including the Stockport Viaduct. Charles Hutton Gregory was the assistant engineer. The station was shared from the beginning with the Sheffield, Ashton-under-Lyne and Manchester Railway (SA&MR) following an agreement made by the promoters in 1837.

The M&BR amalgamated with other railway companies to create the London and North Western Railway (LNWR) in 1846. The SA&MR changed its name to the Manchester, Sheffield and Lincolnshire Railway (MS&LR) three years later.

Manchester London Road
In 1847, the station was renamed London Road. Its single platform which opened on 1 August 1849 to the south of, and adjacent to the main part of station, was the predecessor of through platforms 13 and 14. The MSJA&R's line connected to the main line south of the station and formed a through route to the LNWR's line to Liverpool.

By the 1850s, London Road was overcrowded and the relationship between the LNWR and MS&LR had deteriorated. In 1862, work started on rebuilding the station to expand it. The rebuild allowed the station to be divided; the MS&LR occupying the north-eastern side and the LNWR the south-western side. The station was given a new entrance building and concourse with each company having separate booking offices and passenger facilities. On 20 January 1866, a fatal accident occurred during the roof's construction, when part of it collapsed killing two workmen and injuring 30 others. The enquiry determined that the collapse was caused by strong winds and heavy snowfall. At the same time, the viaduct south of the station to Ardwick was widened to carry four tracks, and both companies built goods stations and warehouses to the northern side of the passenger station.

Within ten years, the station was again over-crowded as traffic continued to increase and expansion was again required. At the same time, the MSJ&AR platform was taken out and rebuilt as an island platform on a girder bridge over Fairfield Street and linked to the main station by a footbridge. In May 1882, the improvements were opened.

In 1897, the MS&LR changed its name to the Great Central Railway (GCR); it opened its own direct route from the station to London in 1899.

In 1910, the adjacent Mayfield station opened with four platforms to alleviate overcrowding at London Road. The stations were linked by a footbridge. Mayfield station closed to passengers in 1960 and to all traffic in 1986. The derelict station has remained in situ despite proposed redevelopment schemes including reopening it to relieve demand. In October 2013 the station's roof/canopies were demolished due to safety concerns.

Following the 1923 railway grouping, the LNWR amalgamated with several other railway companies to create the London, Midland and Scottish Railway (LMS), and the GCR amalgamated with other railways to create the London and North Eastern Railway (LNER). The division of the station was maintained and it continued to be operated as two separate stations even after the nationalisation of the railways in 1948: One side was used by the London Midland Region of British Railways and the other by Eastern Region.

Manchester Piccadilly

Between 1958 and 1966, London Road was rebuilt in the West Coast Main Line modernisation programme undertaken by British Railways. It was renamed "Manchester Piccadilly" on 12 September 1960. Piccadilly is the name of a road and Piccadilly Gardens nearby.

The London Midland Region rebuilt the station at a cost of £1.75million (equivalent to £ million at  prices) in preparation for electric train services to London. Most of the station was rebuilt, except for the Victorian trainsheds which remained mostly unaltered, although the two 1880s spans were shortened towards the concourse end. The station was reconstructed in two phases, 1958–1960 and 1963–1966; the break was the result of a national credit squeeze restricting funding for railway modernisation.

The former MSJA&R through platforms and bridges over Fairfield Street were rebuilt on a prestressed concrete slab bridge with cantilevered sides for the tracks. The layout in the trainshed was reconfigured to add several platforms. A new concourse and entrance were built, alongside which was a ten-storey office block which housed British Rail staff. On 11 May 1966, work was completed for the introduction of electric expresses to London.

The approach to the station was also redeveloped. The LNWR goods warehouse alongside the station approach closed in 1965 and a curved office block, Gateway House, was opened in its place in 1969.

Piccadilly remained open throughout the reconstruction, but there was disruption, and many trains were diverted to Manchester Mayfield or  stations. When the work was completed, those stations were no longer required; they were closed and their services were diverted into Piccadilly.

Picc-Vic tunnel and Metrolink
In the early 1970s, an underground station, Piccadilly Low Level, was proposed as part of the Picc-Vic tunnel project. The project was cancelled in the late 1970s, because of the high cost, and transport planners turned instead towards light rail as a lower-cost option. This resulted eventually in the Manchester Metrolink system which opened in the early 1990s linking the two stations by a street-level tramway and linking two converted rail lines to Altrincham and Bury. The tram stop in the station's undercroft opened in 1992.

Windsor Link
This enhanced Piccadilly's status as Manchester's main station. The link was opened in 1988; it was declared to be fully operational the following year.

2002 redevelopment

Between 1998 and 2002, in preparation for the 2002 Commonwealth Games, the station underwent a £100million redevelopment. The glass roof of the trainshed, which is a Grade II listed structure, was reglazed and repainted. A new main entrance and enlarged concourse with a mezzanine level, designed by BDP, replaced the 1960s structure, which had become insufficient for the number of passengers regularly using the station. A moving walkway was installed to take passengers from the concourse to platforms 13 and 14 on the far south side of the station, which had previously necessitated a long walk. Another entrance was also created on Fairfield Street, which provides access to a new taxi rank along with a drop-off point for private cars.

Electrification
It was electrified with overhead lines, energised at 1,500 V DC in 1931. London Road was the terminus of the electrification scheme which ran through to the through platforms.

The second line to be electrified using 1,500 V DC was the LNER's Woodhead Route from Manchester to Sheffield. Work on the scheme commenced in the late 1930s, but was stopped due to the Second World War, before being restarted in the early 1950s. Electrification was completed in September 1954. The two electric 1,500 V DC lines ran into different parts of the station.

25 kV AC overhead electrification, adopted as the national standard by British Railways, was brought to London Road/Piccadilly in the West Coast Main Line electrification scheme starting in the late-1950s. At the same time, the 1,500 V electrification on the Altrincham line was cut back to Oxford Road to where the new system was extended from the south. The Altrincham line was converted to 25 kV in 1971.

The two systems co-existed for a number of years. The Woodhead Route was closed as a through line in 1981, but local services to Glossop and Hadfield continued to be operated by 1,500 V trains until the line was converted to 25 kV during 1984.

During the 2010s, the Northern Hub scheme saw electrification extended from Manchester to Liverpool in 2015,  and Manchester to Preston and through to Blackpool in 2019.

Architecture

The roof is supported by masonry walls at the outer edges, which have round-headed windows alongside platforms 1 and 12, and rows of cast iron columns along the platforms in its interior space. The roof spans have an arrangement of wrought iron trusses with supporting cast iron struts on girders, which are evenly spaced between the columns.

As built, the roof was largely covered with slates with some areas of glazing; over time, the slates were replaced with boarded felt. Between 1997 and 1999, the station roof was refurbished and the traditional cladding was replaced with around 10,000 panes of toughened glass that 'float' above the wrought iron trusses. Layers of nets have been installed, to catch falling glass in the event of any of the panes were to break.

Below the train shed is the undercroft that was used as a goods station. Cast iron columns and brick arches support the terminal platforms directly above. Since the early 1990s, the undercroft accommodates the Metrolink station, its tracks, sidings, and car parking. Before it was reused for the Metrolink, the cast-iron columns throughout the undercroft were encased in concrete as a protective measure against collision.

George W. Buck designed the original skew arch bridge over Fairfield Street; it had ten cast iron arch ribs, which formed one part of the brick arch viaduct, and was topped with open stonework parapets. The bridge was subsequently widened and wrought iron plate girders and transverse girders were added to support longitudinal joists with iron arch plates. In the 1960s, in the reconstruction programme, the cast iron arches and spandrels were encased in concrete. Platforms 13 and 14 are situated on top of this bridge.

Many of the original station buildings were demolished during the 1960s to clear the way for a new approach. The main entrance leads to a concourse with ground floor, and since the 2000s, mezzanine levels. The Fairfield Street entrance leads to the Metrolink station in the undercroft and is linked to the rail platforms by escalators. Between 1997 and 2002, a redevelopment programme revised the station's layout and a glass partition wall with ticket barriers separating the concourse from the platforms was constructed. The station's approach leading to the end of Piccadilly was constructed in 1969 along with the "wavy" fronted Gateway House designed by the architect Richard Seifert.  Gateway House was modernised during 2003.

Facilities

The Fairfield Street entrance, at basement level, serves the car park, the taxi rank, and the Metrolink station. Above it at track level is a concourse into which the main entrance feeds, housing ticket offices, information points, seating, timetables, toilets, shops, and food and drink outlets. Above the concourse is a second level of food outlets and bars, and the Avanti West Coast First Class Lounge. On the main concourse, doorways in a large glass partition wall access platforms 1 to 12. A travelator leads to the upper concourse linked by a footbridge, steps and lift to platforms 13 and 14. The island lounge contains retail outlets, toilets and a departure lounge. There are vending machines, waiting areas and snack bars on platforms 13 and 14.

Manchester Piccadilly is accessible for disabled people and has escalators and lifts to all levels, wide-access doors and gates, braille signs, hearing loops and disabled toilet facilities.

Cycle racks are available on Fairfield Street and the long-stay car park and next to the tower block at the station front. During March 2010, Manchester City Council and Network Rail unveiled plans for a 'Cycle Centre' to provide secure facilities and on-site maintenance and hire services. The station has a taxi rank, drop-off/pick-up point, and short- and long-stay car parks. accessible from Fairfield Street. The long-stay multi-storey car park is at the rear of the station.

Ticket barriers were installed in Autumn 2016 between platforms 3 and 7, following an application by Virgin Trains. Ticket barriers were fitted on platforms 1-3 by TransPennine Express, Platforms 9-12 remain ungated but for most of the day are staffed with ticket inspectors.

Layout

Platform 1 is on the north side of the station and the through platforms 13 and 14 are on the south side. Of the terminus platforms,

Northern services to Crewe are also frequently seen from these platforms.
 Platforms 5-9 are the longest and are used mainly by Avanti West Coast and CrossCountry services. Platform 5 usually sees the local Northern services to Chester & Stoke-On-Trent. Platform 9 sees the use of the TransPennine Express services from Cleethorpes - Manchester Airport. 

The main entrance and concourse are to the front of the terminal platforms and the taxi and car drop-off entrance is on the southern side on Fairfield Street. The Metrolink tram line passes under the station through the undercroft. Its platforms are under the concourse and railway platforms. To the south of Piccadilly, on the opposite side of Fairfield Street, is the derelict  station, which was closed for railway use in 1986.

Services

The station has 12 terminus platforms, for services terminating from locations to the south of Manchester, and two through platforms 13 and 14. The platforms are split into A and B sections to allow more than one train to stand. The through platforms 13 and 14 are used by through services via  to North Wales, Liverpool, North West England, Yorkshire, North East England, Glasgow and Edinburgh, and through services from Manchester Airport.

Manchester Piccadilly is currently served by six train operating companies:

Avanti West Coast

Class 390 Pendolino units operate all Avanti West Coast services.

CrossCountry

All CrossCountry services are regularly operated by Class 220 Voyager and Class 221 Super Voyager units.

East Midlands Railway

These services are operated by Class 158 Express Sprinter units and occasionally Class 156 "Super Sprinter" units.

Northern Trains
On Sundays this is reduced to 1tph calling at all stations.
 1tph calling at  only. Monday to Saturday only.
Monday to Saturday only.
Some additional morning peak hour services start at Macclesfield. The Sunday service is 6tpd.
The Sunday service is 1 train per 2 hours.
Monday to Saturday only.
Monday to Saturday only.
Monday to Saturday only.

These are operated by a variety of trains including Class 150, Class 156 and Class 158 DMUs or Class 319, Class 323, or Class 331 EMUs.

TransPennine Express
TransPennine Express operate services on three routes.

North TransPennine 

South TransPennine

Anglo-Scottish Route
 1tp2h continue to  calling at,  and 
Class 185 Desiro units operate most TransPennine Express services, with the exception of the Scottish services which are operated by Class 397 Civity units.

Transport for Wales

Most of these services are worked by Class 175 Coradia units. Class 158 Express Sprinter and occasionally Class 150 Sprinter units are seen operating these services when 175s are not available.

Piccadilly tram stop

The Piccadilly Metrolink tram stop is located at ground level in the undercroft underneath the main line station; an area of the station which was historically used for warehousing, it is one of nine stops serving Manchester city centre, within the system's Zone 1. Trams enter the stop from the streets in each direction via short tunnels. There are two platforms: one for eastbound trams towards Etihad Campus and Ashton-under-Lyne, and one for north and westbound trams towards Bury, Eccles and Altrincham. There are steps, lifts and escalators between the platform level and a mezzanine level, along with further steps, lifts and escalators that connect with the main line station's concourse. There are also multiple entrances present at ground level from the surrounding streets.

The tram station was first opened on 20 July 1992, originally being known as Piccadilly Undercroft. As the stop was located directly underneath the main line station platforms, the then station operator British Rail required that it be built inside a protective concrete box, in order to protect the cast iron supports for the main line platforms from the possibility of collision or fire damage.

As Piccadilly originally served as a terminus of the system, early operations saw one platform being used for arrivals from Altrincham, Bury and later Eccles, with the other platform used for departures. Empty trams ran from the arrival platform into a nearby reversing siding in a tunnel, where they would reverse and then enter the departure platform. From the onset, the stop had been designed with future extension in mind; as such, since the opening of the extension towards Ashton in 2013, the former arrivals platform has also been used for departures towards Ashton as well as terminating trams, while the former departures platform also handles arrivals from Ashton. Terminating trams use a reversing siding on the Ashton line between Piccadilly and New Islington tram stops.

During 2008, the tram station was refurbished, after which it became the first station to display the new Metrolink corporate identity. Station signage bears the yellow and silver livery as applied to the new generation of trams since 2009.

According to TfGM, the Piccadilly tram station is one of the most frequented stops on the Metrolink network.

It has been proposed by High Speed Two Limited that the existing Piccadilly stop be moved to a four-platform underground station beneath Manchester Piccadilly High Speed station. Provision for a second stop at ground-level to the east of the high speed station called Piccadilly Central is also proposed to provide for future expansions of the Metrolink network.

Metrolink services
As of 2019, Manchester Piccadilly stop is the terminus for Metrolink services to Bury and Altrincham, and a major stop on the through services between Eccles and MediaCityUK and Ashton-under-Lyne. Services mostly run every 12 minutes on all routes.

Future proposals
In 2009, the Greater Manchester Integrated Transport Authority advocated reopening the neighbouring derelict Mayfield station to alleviate capacity problems but the proposal was not advanced; plans focused on increasing track capacity on the cross-city route between Piccadilly and Oxford Road stations were pursued.

Northern Hub
During the early 2010s, Network Rail promoted its Northern Hub plans, estimated to cost in excess of £560million to improve the heavily congested rail network on the approach into Manchester. A pair of through platforms would be constructed at Piccadilly and the station linked to Manchester Victoria via the Ordsall Chord, cutting journey times on Trans-Pennine routes. The construction of the Ordsall Chord made it possible for trains from the airport to travel via platforms 13 and 14 and Oxford Road to Manchester Victoria and Leeds and via the Calder Valley Line to Bradford Interchange.

Phase 2 aims to alleviate congestion at platforms 13 and 14 by constructing a parallel elevated island platform and allow the minimum time between trains to be decreased from four to three minutes, improving reliability. It will allow four more trains per hour to be timetabled to Oxford Road including a second freight to Trafford Park. Approval for the platforms, at an estimated cost of £200million, was announced during July 2012.

The proposals would simplify train operations at Piccadilly, creating close associations between pairs of lines leading out of the station and particular platforms while requiring only a few crossing moves. Platforms 1 to 4 would be primarily used for services on the 'east' lines, to and from Marple, Glossop and Huddersfield; platforms 5 to 12 would be for services on the 'fast' lines, to and from Crewe and Stoke; through platforms 13 to 16 would be dedicated to services on the present 'slow' lines, to and from Manchester Airport and Hazel Grove.

In July 2013, Network Rail consulted on three options for the additional platforms at Piccadilly, all of which would affect local roads and the Grade II listed Star and Garter public house.

Construction was originally due to begin in 2016, but the project has now been delayed indefinitely.

High Speed 2

To accommodate High Speed 2 (HS2), an extension would require four platforms and a  tunnel under south Manchester to join the West Coast Main Line at Ardwick. Journey times to Manchester Airport would be reduced to 9minutes from 18, Birmingham 41minutes from 86minutes, and London 68minutes from 128. Station upgrades could include enhanced Metrolink services, improved road access and car parking. The line is planned to be completed by 2032.

A major redevelopment of the station and surrounding area has been proposed to complement the HS2 proposals involving the construction of a canopy over the HS2 platforms, the creation of a new entrance, and office, retail and residential development. Designs indicate that the derelict Mayfield Station and the Gateway House office block will be demolished. The plans were approved by the Government in November 2016.

Northern Powerhouse Rail
Northern Powerhouse Rail (NPR) proposals include the construction of new platforms under Piccadilly station and the proposed HS2 platforms. The 2016 'Manchester Piccadilly Options Assessment' by the National Infrastructure Commission stated: "Addition of Northern Powerhouse Rail and Station to the Manchester Piccadilly system will be the last step of the process of transforming the station in to [sic] a transport super hub. The NPR station and its construction will need to be considered throughout the design and implementation of the other station improvements, which form the station concept but which are delivered earlier. The NPR station is proposed to stay underground on its way east as it passes through Manchester city. This provides opportunities and offers location and orientation alternatives. Staying under the existing Piccadilly station or positioning NPR under the HS2 station box will maximise interchange efficiencies and travel distances. The orientation will also dictate the number of vertical connection cores also referred to as “drums” and their locations. The drums will have the function to connect all levels of transport to one and other [sic] at critical junction points."

During October 2017, according to a report to the Manchester City Council’s executive of the various proposals submitted, the development of an underground station has been selected as the preferred option for accommodating the envisioned NPR services, which are speculated to involve the running of up to eight trains per hour, as well as connecting services with the in-development HS2. The importance of directly integrating this underground facility with the existing Piccadilly Station has been emphasised as well; however, the report observes that the necessary financing for the programme is still lacking.

References

Citations

Bibliography

Further reading

External links

 
 Station information on Manchester Piccadilly station, provided by Network Rail
 Tram times and station information for Piccadilly tram stop from Manchester Metrolink

Railway stations in Manchester
Former Great Central Railway stations
Former London and North Western Railway stations
Former Manchester, South Junction and Altrincham Railway stations
DfT Category A stations
Railway stations in Great Britain opened in 1842
Network Rail managed stations
Railway stations served by CrossCountry
Railway stations served by East Midlands Railway
Northern franchise railway stations
Railway stations served by TransPennine Express
Railway stations served by Transport for Wales Rail
Railway stations served by Avanti West Coast
Tram stops in Manchester
Tram stops on the Altrincham to Piccadilly line
Tram stops on the Bury to Ashton-under-Lyne line
Tram stops on the Eccles to Piccadilly line
Grade II listed buildings in Manchester
William Robert Headley railway stations
Stations on the West Coast Main Line